Rusdi Ramli (Jawi: رشدي راملي; born June 16, 1970) is a Malaysian actor and director who won the 20th Malaysia Film Festival for Best Actor at the University of Science Malaysia. He is a son of the veteran Malaysian actress, Norlia Ghani. Rusdi is born in Ulu Kelang and has starred in many Malaysian television and movie dramas. He was named after P. Ramlee's 1970 film, Dr. Rushdi. His late father was Ramli Ismail, popularly known as Ramli Kechik, starred in Do Re Mi (1966), where he accompanied Maon (starring Mahmud June) to the Youth Party while in the 1973 film Laxmana Do Re Mi, Ramli played the role of Prime Minister of Pasir Berdegung Nation in the same film.

Filmography

Film

Television series

Telemovie

Television

Discography

Album
 Rusdi Ramli - The Essential (2011)

References

External links
 

1970 births
Living people
People from Selangor
Malaysian male actors
Malaysian male television actors
Malaysian male film actors
Malaysian film directors
Malay-language film directors
20th-century Malaysian male actors
Malaysian people of Malay descent
Malaysian Muslims